Farley William Moody (September 18, 1891 – October 11, 1918) was an American college football player and a lawyer.

Early years
Farley Moody was born in Tuscaloosa, Alabama on September 18, 1891 to Frank Sims Moody and Mary Farley Maxwell.

University of Alabama
At Alabama he was a member of Phi Delta Theta.

Playing career
Moody was a prominent quarterback for the Alabama Crimson Tide of the University of Alabama from 1909 to 1912.

1910
Moody made the field goal to beat Tulane 5 to 3 in 1910.

1911
Moody scored two touchdowns, including a 40-yard punt return, and added four extra points in the 24 to 0 win over Howard in 1911.

1912
Moody was captain of the 1912 team. He was selected All-Southern. He later died in France while serving in the First World War during the Battle of the Argonne Forest just a month before the Armistice.

Coaching career

1915
He coached the 1915 team with athletic director B. L. Noojin after coach Kelley was hospitalized with typhoid fever. The pair had a record of 2 wins and 2 losses.

Wartime service
Lieutenant Moody died in France while serving in the First World War during the Battle of the Argonne Forest just a month before the Armistice.

References

External links
 

1891 births
1918 deaths
American football quarterbacks
Alabama Crimson Tide football coaches
Alabama Crimson Tide football players
All-Southern college football players
American military personnel killed in World War I
United States Army officers
Sportspeople from Tuscaloosa, Alabama
Players of American football from Alabama
American football drop kickers
United States Army personnel of World War I